The Mapinduzi Cup is a top knockout football tournament in Zanzibar. Mapinduzi meaning Revolution in recognition of the Zanzibar Revolution. The Mapinduzi Cup is a tournament created by the Zanzibar Football Federation to commemorate Zanzibar's Revolution day which is marked annually on 12 January. The first edition of the cup was in 1998. However, the cup is played between Zanzibari clubs together with clubs from Tanzania mainland. Since 2013 clubs from Kenya and Uganda have been invited to take part occasionally.

Along with the Zanzibari Cup and Nyerere Cup, the three tournaments are the three main knockout tournaments in Zanzibar. The maiden edition was won by Jamhuri F.C.

Champions 
Reference:

Winner by club

References 

Football competitions in Zanzibar
Recurring sporting events established in 1998
Football in Zanzibar